The 2005–06 season was the 126th season of competitive association football in England.

Overview
 Chelsea land their second Premier League title in as many seasons. They headed the table virtually all season long and amassed 91 points in retaining the trophy. 
The rebuilt Wembley Stadium was due to open in time for the FA Cup final in May. However, in August 2005, The Football Association reserved the Millennium Stadium as a backup, as there was some doubt whether Wembley would be ready. The doubts were confirmed on 21 February 2006, when The FA announced that the final would indeed be held at Millennium Stadium. On 31 March 2006 The FA confirmed that the new Wembley would not be opened until 2007.
Two clubs opened new stadiums at the beginning of this season:
Coventry City – Ricoh Arena.
Swansea City – Liberty Stadium.
F.C. United of Manchester, formed by disgruntled Manchester United fans, played their first competitive season, competing in the North West Counties Football League Division Two (level 10 of the English football league system), from which they gained promotion at the first time of asking.
Reading broke the previous points record of 105 points, taking 106 points from 46 games, scoring 99 goals to earn promotion to the Premier League.
Wigan Athletic, who earned promotion to the Premier League by finishing second in the Football League Championship, played their first ever season in the top division of English football and comfortably stayed up, staying clear from the threat of relegation all season.
Wigan were the first club to play an inaugural season in the top tier of English football since Barnsley in 1997–98, and the first to avoid relegation in an inaugural top tier season since Millwall in 1988–89.

Diary of the season
29 June 2005 — Chelsea sell Mateja Kezman to Atlético Madrid for £5.3 million.
1 July 2005 — Tottenham Hotspur sign 18-year-old Leeds United winger Aaron Lennon for £1 million.
4 July 2005 — Liverpool sign goalkeeper Pepe Reina from Villarreal for £6 million and Mark González from Albacete for £4.5 million.
5 July 2005 — Park Ji-Sung becomes Manchester United's first Asian player in a £4 million move from PSV Eindhoven.
8 July 2005 — Blackburn Rovers sign Craig Bellamy from Newcastle United for £5 million.
12 July 2005 — Arsenal sign Stuttgart and Belarus midfielder Alexander Hleb for £11.2 million.
15 July 2005 — Patrick Vieira ends nine years at Arsenal in a £13.7 million move to Juventus.
18 July 2005 — Chelsea sign Shaun Wright-Phillips from Manchester City for £21 million.
20 July 2005 — Liverpool sign Peter Crouch from Southampton for £7 million.
27 July 2005 — Manchester City sign Darius Vassell from Aston Villa for £2 million.
4 August 2005 — Phil Neville, who has spent his entire 12-year career at Manchester United, is sold to Everton for £3.5 million.
7 August 2005 — Chelsea claim the first silverware of the season when they beat Arsenal 2–1 at the Millennium Stadium in Cardiff to win the FA Community Shield.
8 August 2005 — Manchester United misfit Kléberson is sold to Beşiktaş of Turkey for £2.5 million.
17 August 2005 — Liberty Stadium hosts its first game; a friendly between Wales and Slovenia. It is the new stadium of Swansea City (replacing 93-year-old Vetch Field), as well as the Ospreys rugby union team.
18 August 2005 — Tottenham Hotspur sell Frédéric Kanouté to Sevilla for £4.4 million.
19 August 2005 — Chelsea pay a club record £24.4 million to Lyon for Ghanaian midfielder Michael Essien.
20 August 2005 — Coventry City take on Queens Park Rangers in their first game at the new 32,500-seat Ricoh Arena.
23 August 2005 — Tiago Mendes leaves Chelsea for Lyon in a £6.5 million deal, while Milan Baroš moves from Liverpool to Aston Villa for the same fee.
26 August 2005 — Liverpool win the UEFA Super Cup beating CSKA Moscow 3–1.
31 August 2005 — August draws to a close with Chelsea looking well placed to defend their Premier League title having won their first four games of the season. Stuart Pearce's Manchester City have made an impressive start to the season as they occupy second place. Charlton Athletic, Manchester United and Bolton Wanderers complete the top five. Newly promoted Sunderland are bottom after losing their first four games of the league season, with Newcastle United and Portsmouth completing the bottom three. Newcastle United break their club transfer record by paying £17 million to Real Madrid for Michael Owen. In the Championship, Sheffield United lead the table with Reading in second place, ahead of newly promoted Luton Town on goal difference. Watford, Southampton and Wolves complete the playoff places. Norwich City, narrowly relegated from the Premier League the previous season, have made a poor start to a campaign thought by many to be a challenge for an immediate return to England's elite and stand one place off the bottom of the Championship, sandwiched by Millwall (bottom) and Sheffield Wednesday.
7 September 2005 — Northern Ireland take a historic 1–0 win over England at Windsor Park, Belfast, strengthening calls for Sven-Göran Eriksson's resignation.
30 September 2005 — Chelsea's 100% start to the season continues after seven games as they finish September with their Premier League leadership intact. Charlton Athletic are their nearest challengers in second place, with Bolton Wanderers, West Ham United (newly promoted) and Manchester United completing the top five. Sunderland remain bottom with just one point so far this season, while Everton and West Bromwich Albion complete the bottom three. In the Championship, Sheffield United hold a six-point advantage over Reading. Luton, Wolves, Watford and Leeds make up the rest of the top six. Sheffield Wednesday, Plymouth Argyle and Crewe Alexandra prop up the table.
8 October 2005 — England defeat Austria 1–0 at Old Trafford, with the Netherlands defeating the Czech Republic the same night, thus assuring England automatic qualification for the 2006 FIFA World Cup, either as the top team in their qualifying group or one of the top two second-placed European teams.
12 October 2005 — England defeat Poland 2–1 at Old Trafford to finish top of their World Cup qualifying group.
17 October 2005 — Middlesbrough defender Abel Xavier is banned from all football after failing a drugs test.
27 October 2005 — England legend Paul Gascoigne, 38, is named manager of Conference North club Kettering Town.
28 October 2005 — Deputy Prime Minister John Prescott gives final approval for Brighton & Hove Albion to build Falmer Stadium, now scheduled to open in 2008.
29 October 2005 — Manchester United become the first team to score 1,000 Premier League goals, in its 14th season.
31 October 2005 — October draws to a close with Chelsea now runaway leaders with 10 wins and a draw from their first 11 games, while their nearest challengers are Wigan Athletic, playing their first top-division season and only their 28th as a professional league club. Tottenham Hotspur, Bolton Wanderers and Charlton Athletic complete the top five, while a disappointing Manchester United and Arsenal are sixth and seventh respectively. Sunderland have at last recorded their first league win of the season but still occupy bottom place, with Birmingham City and Everton completing the bottom three. In the Championship, Reading have closed the gap between them and Sheffield United to three points, with Luton, Watford, Leeds and Crystal Palace completing the top six and Brighton, Crewe and Millwall in the relegation zone.
6 November 2005 — Manchester United become the first team to beat Chelsea in 41 Premier League games, with a Darren Fletcher header securing a 1–0 victory at Old Trafford.
18 November 2005 — Roy Keane leaves Manchester United by mutual consent, ending his 12-year association with the club.
24 November 2005 — Alain Perrin is sacked as manager of Portsmouth after eight months in charge.
30 November 2005 — November ends with Chelsea still top of the Premier League, their nearest contenders now being Manchester United who are 10 points behind and with a game in hand. Arsenal, Wigan Athletic and Tottenham Hotspur complete the top five. Sunderland remain bottom with a mere five points and one win so far, with Birmingham City and Portsmouth completing the bottom three. In the Championship, Reading have overtaken Sheffield United with a four-point advantage. Watford, Leeds, Luton and Cardiff complete the top six, while Crewe, Brighton and Millwall remain in the relegation zone.
3 December 2005 — Harry Redknapp walks out of Southampton after being refused permission to discuss terms with Portsmouth over returning as manager.
5 December 2005 — Paul Gascoigne resigns after just over a month in charge of Kettering Town, during which time they won two, lost two and drew two of their six games.
7 December 2005 — Harry Redknapp is appointed manager of Portsmouth for the second time under contract until the end of the season.
22 December 2005 — George Burley is appointed Harry Redknapp's replacement at Southampton.
31 December 2005 — Chelsea's Premier League continues into 2006 by 11 points over Manchester United, while Liverpool's good run of form has taken them into third place. Tottenham Hotspur and Wigan Athletic complete the top five. Sunderland, Birmingham City and Portsmouth occupy the relegation places. Reading still lead the Championship, with Sheffield United, Leeds, Watford, Crystal Palace and Wolves completing the top six. Sheffield Wednesday, Millwall and Crewe finish the year in the relegation zone.
4 January 2006 — Alexandre Gaydamak takes a 50% stake in Portsmouth alongside Milan Mandarić. Manchester United pay Spartak Moscow £7 million for Serbian defender Nemanja Vidić.
6 January 2006 — Portsmouth sign Benjani from Auxerre for £4.1 million.
8 January 2006 — Burton Albion of the Conference National hold Manchester United to a 0–0 draw in the FA Cup Third Round, earning a lucrative replay at Old Trafford on 18 January 2006 which they lose 5–0.
10 January 2006 — Manchester United sign French defender Patrice Evra from AS Monaco for £5.5 million.
12 January 2006 — Liverpool sign Daniel Agger from Brøndby for £5.8 million.
13 January 2006 — Arsenal sign Emmanuel Adebayor from AS Monaco for £7 million.
20 January 2006 — The Premier League formally charges Portsmouth with "tapping up" Harry Redknapp. Arsenal pay £5 million to Southampton for striker Theo Walcott, who turns 17 on 16 March.
22 January 2006 — West Ham United pay £7.25 million for Norwich City striker Dean Ashton.
23 January 2006 — The FA announces that Sven-Göran Eriksson will leave his post as England national coach after the 2006 FIFA World Cup.
25 January 2006 — Craig Levein is sacked as manager of Leicester City.
30 January 2006 — Phil Brown is sacked as manager of Derby County. Academy boss Terry Westley is appointed interim manager, with player Paul Peschisolido acting as his assistant. Manchester City sign Greek midfielder Georgios Samaras from Heerenveen for £6 million.
31 January 2006 — Chelsea now lead the Premier League by 14 points ahead of Manchester United and 18 points ahead of Liverpool, with Tottenham Hotspur and Arsenal completing the top five. Sunderland, Portsmouth and Birmingham City occupy the three relegation places. Reading lead the Championship by ten points and look almost certain to gain promotion to the top flight for the first time in their history, while Sheffield United (with a game in hand) are eleven points clear of Leeds and Watford in joint third place. Preston North End and Cardiff City complete the top six. Brighton, Millwall and Crewe prop up the table.
2 February 2006 — Graeme Souness is sacked as manager of Newcastle United, and Glenn Roeder was made caretaker manager with Alan Shearer his assistant manager.
4 February 2006 — Alan Shearer becomes Newcastle United's top goalscorer of all time, scoring his 201st goal for the club, against Portsmouth at St. James' Park, beating Jackie Milburn's 200 goal tally which had stood for 49 years.
11 February 2006 — Middlesbrough comfortably defeat reigning Premier League champions Chelsea 3–0 at the Riverside Stadium, the first time José Mourinho's Chelsea have lost by more than a single goal.
18 February 2006 — Liverpool beat Manchester United in the FA Cup for the first time since 1921. The draw was a 5th round matchup.
21 February 2006 — The FA announce that the 2006 FA Cup Final, set for 13 May, will be held at the Millennium Stadium, as the builders of the new Wembley Stadium are unable to guarantee that it will be ready for the match. They also announce that the national team's pre-World Cup friendlies originally scheduled for Wembley will instead be held at Old Trafford.
21 February 2006 — A Football League under-21 team, composed of players from the Football League's three divisions, beats a Lega Nazionale Professionisti under-21 team, composed of players from Serie B, 1–0 at the KC Stadium.
26 February 2006 — Manchester United defeat Wigan Athletic 4–0 at the Millennium Stadium to win the Carling Cup. Should they finish in the top five this season, there will be a UEFA Cup place for the league's sixth highest placed team.
28 February 2006 — The month ends with Chelsea's lead over Manchester United at the top of the Premier League narrowed slightly to 12 points. Liverpool, Tottenham Hotspur and Arsenal once again complete the top five, while Bolton Wanderers occupy the now sought-after sixth place. Sunderland continue to prop up the top flight, having gained just nine points so far this season. Portsmouth and Birmingham City complete the bottom three, with Portsmouth now eight points adrift of safety. The top six remain unchanged from the previous month, although Watford have moved to third and Crystal Palace to fifth. Millwall has changed places in the relegation zone with Brighton, whom they lead on goal difference, while Crewe prop up the table.
6 March 2006 — Mick McCarthy is sacked as manager of Sunderland after his team accumulated just 10 points in 28 matches, with Kevin Ball made caretaker manager for the remainder of the season.
25 March 2006 — Reading became the first side to be promoted to the 2006–07 Premier League after drawing 1–1 at Leicester City. 2006–07 will be the Berkshire club's first ever season in England's top flight (though they would have been automatically promoted in 1995 as Division One runners-up had it not been for a reorganisation of the league which saw them forced into the playoffs where they had lost to Bolton Wanderers in the final).
31 March 2006 — March draws to a close with Chelsea now nine points ahead of Manchester United at the top of the Premier League. Liverpool, Tottenham, Blackburn Rovers and Arsenal complete the top six, while Wigan Athletic are now eighth and their dreams of European football are fading fast. Sunderland are still bottom with 10 points though their relegation has yet to be confirmed. Portsmouth and Birmingham City complete the bottom three, both of them being three points behind 17th-placed West Bromwich Albion and with a game in hand. Reading need only one more win from their last six games to confirm the Championship title, while Sheffield United appear almost certain to join Reading in the top flight. Watford, Leeds, Crystal Palace and Preston North End complete the top six. At the other end of the table, Crewe and Brighton look dead and buried, needing four wins each from their last six games and other results to go their way to avoid relegation. Millwall are only five points adrift in the relegation zone but still look bound for relegation as well, just two seasons after competing in the UEFA Cup.
1 April 2006 — Reading win the Football League Championship title. A 5-0 victory over Derby County with Sheffield United only drawing mean that Reading cannot be overtaken.
14 April 2006 — Sunderland are relegated from the Premier League after a 0–0 draw with Manchester United at Old Trafford. This is the first relegation in the league.
15 April 2006 — Sheffield United become the second side to secure promotion to the Premier League after they beat Cardiff City while Watford and Leeds United only draw with Wolverhampton Wanderers and champions Reading respectively.
15 April 2006 — Accrington Stanley regain their Football League status 44 years after the previous club of the same name lost it due to bankruptcy, after they beat Woking to win the Conference National title.
17 April 2006 — Sheffield Wednesday's 2–0 win at Brighton & Hove Albion ensures that the trio of Brighton, Crewe Alexandra and Millwall are all relegated from the Championship.
17 April 2006 — Alan Shearer plays his last competitive match against, rather fittingly, Sunderland, after a Julio Arca tackle tore his medial collateral ligament.
18 April 2006 — John Lyall, former Ipswich Town and West Ham United manager, dies of a heart attack aged 66.
20 April 2006 — Altrincham of the Conference National have 18 points deducted for fielding an ineligible player 13 times. This points deduction relegates the club to the Conference North.
22 April 2006 — Carlisle United secure promotion to League One after a 1–1 draw at Mansfield Town while Leyton Orient were also held to a draw by the same scoreline at Lincoln City. This promotion comes just one season after Carlisle returned to the Football League following a one-season exile.
22 April 2006 — Walsall are relegated to League Two after losing 3–1 at home to Huddersfield Town and Rotherham United draw with Scunthorpe United.
29 April 2006 — Chelsea successfully retain their Premier League title after beating Manchester United 3–0. On the same occasion, Portsmouth win 2 - 1 at Wigan to confirm their safety and relegated both West Brom and Birmingham, who can only hold on to a goalless draw against Newcastle.
29 April 2006 — Charlton Athletic manager Alan Curbishley announces that he will resign at the end of the season, ending a 15-year-long tenure as manager at The Valley.
29 April 2006 — Southend United secure promotion from League One after they draw 2–2 at Swansea City while Brentford also draw against Hartlepool United. Also in League One, Swindon Town are relegated to League Two after they could only draw 1–1 against Bristol City.
29 April 2006 — Northampton Town secure promotion from League Two after beating Chester City 1–0. Rushden & Diamonds are relegated to the Conference National when they lose 2–0 away to Boston United and other results go against them.
30 April 2006 — Reading break Sunderland's record for most points in any professional English league, beating Queens Park Rangers 2–1 to finish on 106 points.
30 April 2006 — April draws to a close with Chelsea confirmed as champions, while Manchester United and Liverpool are the next highest teams level on points. Tottenham Hotspur, Arsenal and Blackburn Rovers complete the top six. Sunderland are bottom and were relegated two weeks ago, while West Bromwich Albion and Birmingham City's relegation has just been confirmed. It is a brilliant time for Portsmouth, who looked dead and buried barely two months ago.
4 May 2006 — Current Middlesbrough manager Steve McClaren signs a four-year contract agreeing to succeed Sven-Göran Eriksson as England head coach after the World Cup. The contract begins on 1 August.
4 May 2006 — Newcastle United are refused permission to appoint caretaker manager Glenn Roeder on a permanent basis as he does not possess the required coaching qualifications.
6 May 2006 — Southend United, after defeating Bristol City, become League One champions, while Colchester United secure the second automatic place to the Championship after managing a draw at Yeovil while Brentford can only draw away at AFC Bournemouth; Colchester will play in the top two tiers in English football for the first time in their history after their promotion. Around the same time, both Hartlepool United and Milton Keynes Dons are relegated to League Two after both teams can only draw while Rotherham United survive.
6 May 2006 — Oxford United lose their league status after 44 years and are relegated from the football league following a 3–2 defeat by Leyton Orient, who are promoted to League One after their win while Grimsby Town can only draw against all ready promoted Northampton Town.
7 May 2006 — Sunderland finish the season on 15 points, the lowest points total ever in top-flight English football since 3 points for a win was introduced in the 1981–82 season.
9 May 2006 — Roy Keane's testimonial is played at Old Trafford, with Manchester United beating Celtic 1–0 thanks to a second half Cristiano Ronaldo goal.
10 May 2006 — Middlesbrough lose the UEFA Cup final 4–0 to Sevilla in Steve McClaren's last game in charge at the Philips Stadion in Eindhoven. On the same day, the Premier League change their mind over the Glenn Roeder situation at Newcastle United and give him permission to take on the manager's role on a permanent basis despite him not having the requiring coaching qualifications.
11 May 2006 — Alan Shearer's testimonial is played at St James' Park, with a Newcastle XI beating Celtic 3–2, with Shearer scoring the winning penalty. Joe Royle leaves Ipswich Town "by mutual consent".
13 May 2006 — Liverpool win the 125th FA Cup final beating West Ham United 3–1 on penalties after a thrilling 3–3 draw after extra time.
16 May 2006 — Lincoln City become the first team to lose four consecutive play-off competitions following a 3–1 aggregate defeat to neighbors Grimsby Town in the League Two semi-finals.
17 May 2006 — Arsenal lose in the UEFA Champions League final to Barcelona 2–1 in the Stade de France. Jens Lehmann is sent off controversially after fouling Samuel Eto'o and Ludovic Giuly puts the ball into the back of the net.
20 May 2006 — Hereford United gain promotion to League Two after beating Halifax Town 3–2 in the Conference Playoff Final, after extra time.
21 May 2006 — Watford gain promotion to the Premier League after defeating Leeds United 3–0 in the Championship play-off final.
23 May 2006 — Arsenal sign Tomáš Rosický from Borussia Dortmund for £6.8 million.
27 May 2006 — Barnsley win promotion to the Championship after overcoming Swansea City in the League One play-off final. They win 4–3 on penalties after both sides remained level at 2–2 after extra time.
28 May 2006 — Cheltenham Town win promotion to the League One by defeating Grimsby Town 1–0 in the League Two play-off final.
30 May 2006 — Everton pay a club record £8.6 million for Crystal Palace striker Andrew Johnson, and Chelsea sign Salomon Kalou from Feyenoord for £8 million.
31 May 2006 — Chelsea pay a national record £30 million for Milan and Ukraine striker Andriy Shevchenko.
2 June 2006 — Billy Davies leaves Preston North End to become manager of Derby County.
4 June 2006 — Scarborough are relegated from the Conference National for a breach of league rules. They take Altrincham's relegation place.
8 June 2006 — The BBC's Match of the Day will show Premier League highlights for at least another four seasons after £171.6 million bid for television rights was accepted.
10 June 2006 — England open their World Cup campaign with a 1–0 win over Paraguay.
14 June 2006 — Everton sign defender Joleon Lescott from Wolverhampton Wanderers for £5 million, and Chelsea sell striker Eiður Guðjohnsen to Barcelona for £8 million.
15 June 2006 — England beat Trinidad and Tobago 2–0 to confirm their qualification for the last 16 of the World Cup.
20 June 2006 — England draw 2–2 with Sweden in their final group game.
22 June 2006 — Liverpool pay £6 million to Blackburn Rovers for winger Craig Bellamy.
25 June 2006 — England reach the World Cup quarter-finals for the second tournament in succession with a 1–0 win over Ecuador in the second round.
1 July 2006 — England lose on penalties to Portugal after a goalless draw in the World Cup quarter-finals. Tottenham Hotspur sign Bulgarian striker Dimitar Berbatov from Bayer Leverkusen for £10.9 million. Former Tottenham Hotspur and England manager Glenn Hoddle resigns at Wolverhampton Wanderers.

National team
England qualified for the 2006 FIFA World Cup, after finishing top of UEFA Qualifying Group 6.

Key
 H = Home match
 A = Away match
 N = Neutral site match
 F = Friendly
 WCQ = FIFA World Cup 2006 Qualifying, European zone Group 6
 WCF = FIFA World Cup 2006 Finals

Honours

European qualification

League tables

FA Premier League

Chelsea, on 91 points, won their second Premier League title in a row. Manchester United, whose 83-point tally would have been enough for title glory in most seasons, finished runners-up. Liverpool's league form improved drastically following the previous season and they finished in third place, just one point behind United; in addition, they also won the FA Cup, giving manager Rafael Benítez his second major trophy in just his second season. Arsenal snatched the last Champions League spot from under the noses of local rivals Tottenham Hotspur, after the latter's players went down with a bout of food-poisoning. The Gunners''' 4–2 victory over Wigan Athletic on the final day of the season saw them end 92 years of playing at Highbury before they moved into their new 60,000-seat Emirates Stadium.

Ultimately joining Tottenham in the UEFA Cup were Blackburn Rovers and West Ham United who were promoted the previous season and took the European spot by virtue of being FA Cup runners-up. Despite narrowly losing on penalties to Liverpool, the Hammers enjoyed a successful first season back amongst the elite, finishing in a comfortable 9th place.

Fellow newly promoted side Wigan, who were many pundit's tip for relegation in pre-season, defied the odds to finish 10th in their first season in the top-flight. Everton crashed out of the Champions League early and were in the relegation zone by October, but a good run of results both after Halloween and in the new year saw them comfortably finish in 11th. Middlesbrough finished 14th after a disappointing league season, but did reach the UEFA Cup Final – the first European final in their history – where they were beaten 4–0 by Sevilla.

In contrast to the other promoted sides, Sunderland, last seasons Championship winners, were relegated with a league record low of 15 points, breaking the previous record that they set themselves in 2002–03, while West Bromwich Albion and Birmingham City both hit the 30-point mark and battled bravely, but both were unable to avoid relegation after dismal runs of league form (the Baggies going winless from February onwards, with Birmingham unable to shake off poor away form). Portsmouth spent almost the entire season in the relegation zone, but after the return of Harry Redknapp (many Portsmouth fans were convinced Redknapp only went to bitter rivals Southampton last season just to get them relegated), they stayed up after a late run of good results.

Leading goalscorer: Thierry Henry (Arsenal) – 27

The Football League

Football League Championship

Reading entered the top flight for the first time in their history, breaking Sunderland's points record of 105 in the process by accumulating 106 points (coincidentally, Sunderland were relegated from the Premier League while breaking the record for lowest number of points under the current scoring system). Sheffield United joined them, returning to the Premier League after twelve years and earning Neil Warnock his fourth promotion as a manager. Surprise package Watford, initially tipped for relegation, entered the play-offs and beat Leeds United 3–0 in the Millennium Stadium final, who were unable to shake off a bad run of form (worse than any of the three relegated sides) that saw them lose out in the race for automatic promotion.

Crystal Palace fared the best out of the teams relegated from the Premier League the previous season, by getting to the play-offs but losing in the semi-finals. Norwich never managed better than mid-table, while Southampton endured an awful season that saw Sir Clive Woodward take up a much-criticized role as director of football, manager Harry Redknapp return to local rivals Portsmouth and the side looking in danger of relegation for much of the season, only managing a mid-table finish with a late surge in form, thanks to the appointment of George Burley. Chairman Rupert Lowe ultimately paid the price by being forced to resign after the end of the season.

The relegation battle was principally fought by four sides: Crewe, Brighton, Millwall and Sheffield Wednesday. Wednesday ultimately won the battle, and the remaining three were relegated all on the same day, after Wednesday beat Brighton 2–0. Although Crewe and Brighton had not spent long in the division and were considered to be punching above their weight, Millwall underwent a disastrous season, getting through five managers and four chairmen before relegation.

Leading goalscorer: Marlon King (Watford) – 21

Football League One

Southend United surprised many by winning a second successive promotion, returning to the Championship after nearly a decade (when it was called Division One). Colchester United also made the Championship for the first time in their history, but their promotion was tempered by the loss of manager Phil Parkinson to Hull City. A highly competitive play-off race saw Barnsley emerge as winners, beating Swansea City at the Millennium Stadium 4–3 on penalties after both normal time and extra-time finished 2–2, to return to the Championship after three seasons of struggle in Division Two/League One.

Following relegation and becoming the first former European champions to be subsequently relegated to the third tier of their domestic league, Nottingham Forest struggled for most of the season and were in danger of suffering a second successive relegation. The departure of Gary Megson saw a late upturn in form and surge towards the play-offs; however, they missed out on the last day of the season, finishing 7th.

At the bottom, Walsall endured their second relegation in three seasons, Swindon became the first former Premier League side to slip to the bottom division. Hartlepool crashed out of the division after nearly earning promotion last season, while MK Dons suffered the relegation they only avoided the previous season when Wrexham were docked points for entering administration.

Leading goalscorers: Billy Sharp (Scunthorpe United) – 23, and Freddy Eastwood (Southend United) – 23

Football League Two

Carlisle United were another side who earned a second successive promotion, only two years after a relegation from the League that some predicted would see the end of the club. Northampton Town joined them, making up for two seasons of play-off disappointment, and Leyton Orient ended a decade in the bottom division by earning promotion in almost the last minute of the season. Grimsby Town conceded on 91 minutes, and 14 seconds after the fans of Orient celebrated, Lee Steele scored to seal promotion for Orient. Wycombe started the season with a 21-game unbeaten run that saw five of their players named in the PFA League Two team of the year. Two tragic off-the-field events, however, saw them fall away in the second part of the season before losing to Cheltenham Town in the playoff semi-finals. Grimsby Town lost 1–0 to Cheltenham in the final at the Millennium Stadium.

Rushden & Diamonds failed to improve on the previous season, and paid the price with relegation to the Conference. Oxford United joined them, despite the return of manager Jim Smith, and became the first former winners of a major trophy to be relegated to the Conference, doing so on the last day of the season.

Leading goalscorer: Rickie Lambert (Rochdale) – 22

Non-League football

Transfer deals

Summer transfer window

The summer transfer window ran from the end of the previous season until 31 August.

January transfer window

The mid-season transfer window ran from 1 to 31 January 2006.For subsequent transfer deals see List of English football transfers 2006–07''

Famous debutants

 Micah Richards, 17-year-old defender, makes his debut for Manchester City against Arsenal in a 1–0 Premier League defeat at Highbury on 22 October 2005.
 Theo Walcott, 16-year-old forward, makes his debut for Southampton on the opening day of the Championship season as a substitute in the goalless home draw with Wolverhampton Wanderers – the club's first game outside the top flight for nearly 30 years.

Retirements

22 April 2006 — Alan Shearer, 35, retires after being ruled out for the rest of the season by an injury suffered on 17 April in his 404th appearance for Newcastle United since joining them in 1996. He was due to retire at the end of the season but the injury meant that the game against Sunderland was his last.
8 May 2006 — Duncan Ferguson, 34, leaves Everton on a free transfer at the end of his playing career which has also taken in spells at Dundee United, Glasgow Rangers and Newcastle United, the last of which came between his two spells with Everton.
17 May 2006 — Dennis Bergkamp, 37, decided to retire after the 2006 UEFA Champions League Final defeat to Barcelona, ending an 11-year stint at Arsenal. He also had experience playing for Ajax and Internazionale. He was ranked 2nd on the list of 50 greatest players to play for Arsenal, behind record Arsenal goalscorer, Thierry Henry.
8 June 2006 — Nigel Martyn, 39, retires due to an ankle injury. He spent the final three seasons of his career at Everton having signed from Leeds United in September 2003, and earlier in his career had spells with Bristol Rovers and Crystal Palace, as well as being an England goalkeeper.
12 June 2006 — Roy Keane, 34, who until 18 November spent more than 12 years with Manchester United before joining Celtic, retires due to a long-standing hip injury. He arrived onto the English football scene in 1990 with Nottingham Forest.

Deaths
8 September 2005 — Noel Cantwell, 72, died of cancer. He was a Republic of Ireland international at left-back during the 1950s and 1960s. He also captained Manchester United's FA Cup winning team in 1963. As a manager he led Coventry City to their only European campaign in 1969–70.
11 October 2005 - Oscar Hold, 85, played 104 league games for Aldershot, Norwich City, Notts County, Everton and QPR as a forward before moving into management, where he took charge of Doncaster Rovers, Fenerbahce and Goztepe of Turkey, and Apollon Limassol of Cyprus before retiring from the game in 1984. By the time of his death, he was living in Sunderland.
18 October 2005 — Johnny Haynes, 71, former England and Fulham midfielder, who became the first English footballer to be paid £100-a-week, died after suffering a brain haemorrhage while driving in Edinburgh, resulting in a head-on collision with another vehicle.
26 October 2005 — George Swindin, 90, was a former goalkeeper of Arsenal in the 1930s to the 1950s. He helped them win two league titles and one FA Cup. After retiring, he served Arsenal as manager.
25 November 2005 — George Best, 59, Northern-Irish-born striker who enjoyed the early and most successful years of his career Manchester United, died in London's Cromwell Hospital from multiple organ failure, the result of more than 30 years of heavy drinking, three years after he underwent a liver transplant. Personal problems meant that he played his last game for United at the age of 27, but he continued at various smaller clubs – including a brief spell with the Los Angeles Aztecs in America – until the age of 37, when he played his last professional game at AFC Bournemouth. His death dominated news bulletins and his funeral was shown live on the BBC.
26 December 2005 — Ted Ditchburn, 84, former England and Tottenham goalkeeper.
14 January 2006 — Mark Philo, 21, Wycombe winger, was killed in a car crash.
9 February 2006 — Ron Greenwood, 84, former West Ham United and England manager. He managed West Ham to victory in the FA Cup in 1964 and Cup Winners' Cup success a year later. Greenwood later managed the England team, achieving qualification for Euro 80 and the 1982 World Cup.
1 March 2006 — Peter Osgood, 59, former England striker, died of a heart attack while attending a family funeral. He played in Chelsea's 1970 FA Cup and 1971 Cup Winners' Cup victories, and won another FA Cup medal in 1976 with his next club Southampton.
3 April 2006 - Billy Kiernan, 80, played 378 league games as a left winger for Charlton Athletic between 1949 and 1961 after playing in Hong Kong where he was stationed with the Royal Ulster Rifles. He also starred for the London XI which participated in the Inter-Cities Fairs Cup in the late 1950s.
18 April 2006 — John Lyall, 66, former West Ham United and Ipswich Town manager, died of a heart attack. He completed his first season in management at West Ham with FA Cup glory in 1975, winning the trophy again in 1980 and taking West Ham to their highest-ever league position – third – in 1986. He was sacked when West Ham were relegated in 1989, but made a comeback the following year with Ipswich Town. Lyall took Ipswich into the inaugural Premier League as Second Division champions in 1992, and remained in charge for another two-and-half years before he was sacked in December 1994. Lyall never returned to management after his dismissal from Ipswich.
24 April 2006 — Brian Labone, 66, former Everton captain who played in Harry Catterick's successful 1960s side, died of a heart attack. He helped them win the FA Cup in 1966 as well as the league title in 1963 and 1970. Labone was also capped 26 times by England between 1962 and 1970, but did not make the squad for England's victorious 1966 World Cup campaign.

References